Athletic Bilbao is a professional association football club based in Bilbao, Spain, which plays in La Liga. This chronological list comprises all those who have held the position of president of the first team of Athletic Bilbao from 1901, when the first president was elected, to the present day. Each president's entry includes his dates of tenure, honours won and significant achievements while under his care.

List of presidents

References

External links
 Presidents at Athletic Bilbao official website 

 
Presidents
Athletic Bilbao-related lists